Lakhpul is a village near Adampur in the Hisar district of the Indian state of Haryana.

Villages in Hisar district
Hisar (city)